Johny may refer to:

 Johny, a character in the nursery rhyme "Johny Johny Yes Papa"
 Johny Hendricks (born 1983), American mixed martial artist
 Johny Joseph (civil servant) (born 1952), Municipal Commissioner of Mumbai
 Johny Lahure (1942–2003), Luxembourg politician
 Johny Pitts, English television presenter
 Johny Schleck (born 1942), Luxembourg racing cyclist

See also

 Johnny, a more common given name
 Johnny (disambiguation)
 John (disambiguation)
 Johny Mera Naam

Feminine given names
Masculine given names